The Come Alive Tour is singer-songwriter Mark Schultz's and singing trio Point of Grace's first tour together.

Background
Mark and Point of Grace announced the tour during the summer of 2009. Tickets were sold out in the first two hours of the announcement. Mark sang songs from his new album, Come Alive, and Point of Grace sang from their 2007 album, How You Live.

Opening acts
Point of Grace

Tour dates

Personnel
Vocals – Mark Schultz, Point of Grace

References

2009 concert tours
Christian concert tours